Racine Danish Kringles is a family run bakery located at 2529 Golf Avenue, on the North Side of Racine, Wisconsin, that specializes in Kringles. The bakery's tagline is, "It's not just a treat, it's a tradition."

Kringles are made by hand by placing butter between layers of Danish pastry dough to create a flaky crust. Originally shaped like a knotted pretzel, a typical Racine Kringle is formed into an oval. It can be filled with a variety of fruit, nuts and candy flavor combinations before the pastry is baked.

History 

The bakery opened in 1981 and primarily distributed Kringles through wholesale. Kringles were supplied to grocery stores throughout the Midwest and DSD (Direct Store Delivery) where fresh Kringles were delivered to nearby stores. Kringles were also available to local fundraising groups. In October 1988, Mike and Roylene Heyer officially purchased Racine Danish Kringles. At the time, the business was producing 400,000 Kringles annually and employed about eight people. In order to grow the business, they built awareness of Kringles beyond Wisconsin borders.

In 1994, Mike Heyer introduced his Kringles as a corporate gift at the Tomorrow's Products and Services Exhibit.

Mike Heyer's son Christopher took over as president of Racine Danish Kringles in July 2012.

Today 

Currently, the company continues with DSD to nearby grocery and specialty stores. Kringles are distributed wholesale throughout Wisconsin and nearby states including Michigan, Indiana, Illinois, Minnesota, Iowa and Missouri. Racine Danish Kringles offers Kringles as a fundraising product to  non-profit organizations. The bakery also produces Aunt Marie's Cheesecakes, brownies, cinnamon nuns, and cookie dough. Racine Danish Kringles is a Kosher certified bakery. Food Network Magazine's December 2013 Holiday Issue included Racine Danish Kringles as the featured food gift from Wisconsin in their "50 States, 50 Food Gifts" article.

The bakery accepts orders by mail, phone or fax. Kringles can be shipped anywhere in the United States within two days.

Lawmakers designated the Kringle as the official Wisconsin State Pastry on July 1, 2013.

Articles
 Racine Danish Kringles featured as a Food Gift in Food Network Magazine, December 2013(video)

See also
 Kringle

References

External links
 Kringle Official website
 Kringle featured in National Geographic Magazine

Bakeries of the United States
Companies based in Wisconsin
Danish-American culture in Wisconsin
Jews and Judaism in Wisconsin
Milchig restaurants
Restaurants established in 1981